Katherine Green may refer to:

 Katherine Green (screenwriter), see Sugar and Spice (American TV series)
 Kate Green (born 1960), British Member of Parliament
 Kate Green (producer), Canadian film producer

See also
 Kat Green, American actress and producer
 Kathe Green (born 1944), American actress, model and singer
 Katie Green (born 1987), English model
 Katy Green (disambiguation)
 Catherine Green (disambiguation)
 Kate Greenaway (1846–1901), English Victorian artist and writer
 Kathryn Greene, French and American photographer
 Kathy Greenwood (born 1962), Canadian actress 
 Katharine Greene Amory (1731–1777), American journalist